Vithal Rao Aatmaram Shivpurkar also known as Pandit Vithal Rao (1929 – 25 June 2015) was an Indian classical vocalist. He is considered to have been one of the last few maestros of 'Ghazals' and was the last court singer of the Last Nizam of Hyderabad. He is popular for singing ghazals written by Hyderabad writers, Urdu as well as Hindi ghazals.

Early life
Vithal Rao Aatmaram Shivpurkar popularly known as Vithal Rao or Guruji was born in 1929 in Hyderabad, India.

Performing career

Vithal Rao was a court musician of the Last Nizam of Hyderabad. He is popular with the noble families of Hyderabad. Among his notable accompanists include Ustad Sardar Khan (tabla).

Among his notable disciples is Kiran Ahluwalia and playback and folk singer, Rahul Sipligunj.

Discography
Some his popular ghazals are:
 Ek chamele ke mandve tale
 Maine teri aaakho mein pada, sab bhool gaya bus yaad raha sirf Allah hi Allah (Sufiana Kalam)
 Aye mere ham nasheen
 Nindiya Na Aaye
 O Sitamgar Tera Muskurana Kaam Aane Ke Qabil Nahin Hai
 Zehal-e miskin makun taghaful, duraye naina banaye batiyan
 Ghazals of Janab Sayeed Shaheedi

References

Indian male ghazal singers
Singers from Hyderabad, India
1929 births
2015 deaths
20th-century Indian male classical singers
Singers from Andhra Pradesh